Sybra kaszabiana is a species of beetle in the family Cerambycidae. It was described by Breuning in 1977.

References

kaszabiana
Beetles described in 1977